Salem is the county seat of Fulton County, Arkansas, United States. Salem was first incorporated in 1900. As of the 2010 census the population stood at 1,635.

Geography

Salem is located near the center of Fulton County at the intersection of US Route 62 and 412 with Arkansas Highways 9 and 395.

Climate
Salem has a humid subtropical climate with mild winters and hot summers. The average annual low temperature is 44 degrees and the average annual high is 67.

Protected areas
Salem City Park has a walking trail, volleyball court, picnic pavilions, children’s play area, and a lake that is stocked with fish. Preacher Roe Park is located on Highway 9 and offers a baseball/softball field and basketball court for aspiring athletes of all ages.

Lake Norfork is a short drive away, and it offers water skiing, swimming, fishing, and boating opportunities. The lake offers excellent striped bass fishing, with some of these monster fish weighing over 50 pounds. The lake is also good for largemouth, smallmouth and Kentucky bass fishing, and the bays and ponds are loaded with fast-biting bream and other panfish.

Wildlife abounds and the area is a popular deer and turkey hunting area. Experienced hunters can quickly achieve their bag limit in this area, and novice hunters usually return with some interesting stories.

Demographics

2020 census

As of the 2020 United States census, there were 1,566 people, 818 households, and 451 families residing in the city.

2000 census
As of the census of 2000, there were 1,591 people, 679 households, and 412 families residing in the city. The racial makeup of the city was 97.42% White, 0.31% Black or African American, 0.31% Native American, 0.31% Asian, and 1.63% from two or more races.  0.50% of the population were Hispanic or Latino of any race.

There were 679 households, out of which 27.1% had children under the age of 18 living with them, 46.4% were married couples living together, 11.8% had a female householder with no husband present, and 39.3% were non-families. 37.0% of all households were made up of individuals, and 21.8% had someone living alone who was 65 years of age or older.  The average household size was 2.22 and the average family size was 2.92.

In the city, the population was spread out, with 23.4% under the age of 18, 7.9% from 18 to 24, 23.6% from 25 to 44, 19.2% from 45 to 64, and 26.0% who were 65 years of age or older.  The median age was 41 years. For every 100 females, there were 81.4 males.  For every 100 females age 18 and over, there were 73.6 males.

The median income for a household in the city was $20,714, and the median income for a family was $28,359. Males had a median income of $22,368 versus $17,356 for females. The per capita income for the city was $12,891.  About 17.8% of families and 21.8% of the population were below the poverty line, including 27.7% of those under age 18 and 20.8% of those age 65 or over.

Government

Salem operates within the mayor-city council form of government. The mayor is elected by a citywide election to serve as the Chief Executive Officer (CEO) of the city by presiding over all city functions and allocating duties to city employees. The Salem mayoral election coincides with the election of the President of the United States. Mayors serve four-year terms and can serve unlimited terms. The city council is the unicameral legislature, consisting of four council members. Also included in the council's duties is balancing the city's budget and passing ordinances.

Human resources

Education

Primary and secondary education
The Salem School District has two campuses: Salem Elementary School (K–6) and Salem High School (7–12) with 700-plus district enrollment.

Higher education
Three public two-year colleges are located in adjoining counties. Ozarka College is located at Melbourne in Izard County with a satellite campus at Ash Flat in Sharp County. Arkansas State University–Mountain Home is in Baxter County and Missouri State University–West Plains in West Plains, Missouri. Many Salem High graduates choose to attend the larger universities Arkansas State University in Jonesboro, or University of Arkansas in Fayetteville.

Libraries

The Fulton County Library is located at 205 Pickens in Salem. It is part of the White River Regional Library System.

Public health
Fulton County Hospital is an acute hospital certified by CMS and licensed by the state as a 25-bed critical access hospital. The hospital provides 24-hour emergency service and general diagnostic testing including clinical laboratory testing, general x-ray and CT. Ultrasound and MRI are provided on a scheduled basis. Fulton County Hospital has an active (admitting) staff of six physicians. Four of the physicians specialize in family practice and two are internists. The consulting staff consists of 18 physicians in the specialties of Diagnostic Radiology, Caridology, ENT and Pathology.

Five Family Medical Clinics serve Salem with one clinic in Mammoth Spring in the north east section of Fulton County. Salem also has four Pharmacies. Four agencies offer Home Health Services. The community has one Nursing and Rehabilitation Center and one Assisted Living Facility.

Fulton County Hospital operates a Paramedic Ambulance Service and an Air Ambulance Service is based in an adjoining county.

Culture and contemporary life
Smallmouth bass fishing and canoeing exist in the nearby South Fork of the Spring River. It is also not far to White River, nationally known for its big rainbow and brown trout, or to Spring River and the Strawberry River. Both the Spring and Strawberry are excellent float streams, with the added bonus of rainbow trout and walleye in Spring River, and the smallmouth bass, crappie and bream in the Strawberry River. The Spring river boasts some popular canoe rental and tourist companies which facilitate impromptu weekend canoe or camping trips.

The landscape is especially beautiful during the fall, and the focal overlooking hill, the Salem Knob (historically a public park, now privately owned) and surrounding area offers many photographic opportunities.

Annual cultural events
The area has a culture rich in originating the bluegrass music tradition, and each year boasts the Fulton County Homecoming event that allows local and visiting artists to gather and perform on the town square.

Mammoth Spring State Park hosts an annual Old Soldiers Reunion, which originated as a way to celebrate the reunification of the Confederacy with the Union following the Civil War. Now, the Reunion is a fair-like event that offers entertaining Civil War Re-enactments, rides, games, traditional bluegrass and other varieties of music entertainment for a three- or four-day period annually.

During the annual Fulton County Fair, there is a public area behind the Salem City Park which hosts rodeos, tractor pulls, livestock shows, concerts, rides and games.

Infrastructure

Major highways

U.S. Routes 62/412 pass through the south side of the city, leading southeast  to Ash Flat and west  to Mountain Home. Arkansas Highway 9 passes through the center of town, leading northeast  to Mammoth Spring and southwest  to Mountain View.

Utilities
Electricity is provided by the North Arkansas Electric Cooperative, which is based in Salem.

References

External links
 Salem Chamber of Commerce
 Ozark Weather & Radar

Cities in Fulton County, Arkansas
Cities in Arkansas
County seats in Arkansas
Populated places established in 1900